Cornelius Coughlan VC (27 June 1828 – 14 February 1915) was an Irish recipient of the Victoria Cross, the highest and most prestigious award for gallantry in the face of the enemy that can be awarded to British and Commonwealth forces.

Details
Coughlan was 28 years old, and a Colour Sergeant in the 75th Regiment of Foot (later The Gordon Highlanders), British Army during the Indian Mutiny when the following action took place on 8 June and 18 July 1857 at Delhi, British India for which he was awarded the VC:

Queen Victoria wrote a personal letter to Coughlan after hearing about his acts of bravery.

Later life
Coughlan returned from India to serve for two decades in the Connaught Rangers in Ireland achieving the rank of sergeant-major. 

He died in Westport, County Mayo on 14 February 1915 and is buried locally in Aughavale Cemetery near Murrisk. His grave was unmarked until 2004, when a headstone was erected.

The medal
His Victoria Cross is displayed at the National War Museum of Scotland (Edinburgh Castle, Edinburgh, Scotland).

References

Further reading
The Register of the Victoria Cross (1981, 1988 and 1997)

Ireland's VCs (Dept of Economic Development, 1995)
Monuments to Courage (David Harvey, 1999)
Irish Winners of the Victoria Cross (Richard Doherty & David Truesdale, 2000)
 "Sgt. Major Cornelius Coughlan VC", James Scannell, in Journal of the Genealogical Society of Ireland, vol. 5 no. 4, winter 2004, pp. 254–256.

External links
 
1911 Irish Census Return

1828 births
1915 deaths
19th-century Irish people
Gordon Highlanders soldiers
Connaught Rangers soldiers
Irish recipients of the Victoria Cross
Indian Rebellion of 1857 recipients of the Victoria Cross
People from County Galway
British Army recipients of the Victoria Cross
People from Westport, County Mayo